Western Asset Management Company is a global fixed-income investment firm headquartered in Pasadena, California, with nine offices on five continents and $484.5 billion in assets under management as of December 31, 2020. The firm offers institutional and retail investors a broad range of core, sector-specific, and customized bond portfolios across every sector of the bond market. The company utilizes a team-based investment approach and has focused exclusively on fixed-income securities since its founding in 1971.

History

Early years (1971-1986)
Western Asset Management Company was founded in October 1971 by United California Bank (which later became First Interstate), and became an SEC-registered investment advisor in December of that year. In December 1986, Western Asset was acquired by Legg Mason, Inc.

Expansion (1996-present)
In February 1996, Legg Mason acquired Lehman Brothers Global Asset Management Limited, based in London, to broaden Western Asset's non-dollar capabilities. Now known as Western Asset Management Company Limited, it operates as the firm’s London office. To enhance its presence in Asia, Western Asset Management Company Pte. Ltd. was established in Singapore.

In December 2003, the fixed-income division of Rothschild Asset Management (Singapore) Limited was acquired by Legg Mason and merged into the existing operation. To further develop Western Asset's capabilities and global presence, Legg Mason acquired a substantial part of Citigroup's asset management business in exchange for its brokerage and capital markets business. As part of the transaction, Western Asset gained new offices in New York, São Paulo, Hong Kong, Tokyo and Melbourne, in addition to related staff and assets.

In December 2011, Western Asset opened a representative office in Dubai.

In July 2020, Franklin Templeton acquired Legg Mason, making Western Asset Management one of Franklin Templeton's Specialist Investment Managers.

About Franklin Templeton: Franklin Resources, Inc. [NYSE: BEN] is a global investment management organization operating, together with its subsidiaries, as Franklin Templeton. Franklin Templeton’s goal is to deliver better outcomes by providing global and domestic investment management to retail, institutional and sovereign wealth clients in over 170 countries.

References

1971 establishments in California
American companies established in 1971
Companies based in Pasadena, California
Financial services companies established in 1971
Financial services companies based in California
Investment management companies of the United States